Gabat also spelled Gubut is a village and former petty princely state in Gujarat, western India.

The village is in Bayad Taluka of Sabarkantha District.

History 
The Seventh Class state  and taluka, in Mahi Kantha, included eight more villages, covering in total ten square miles. It was ruled by Kshatriya Makwana Koli Chieftains who held the Thakor title. In 1901, Gabat had a combined population of 604, yielding 2,831 Rupees state revenue (1903-4, mostly from land) and paying 43 Rupees tribute to Idar State.

Sources and external links 

 Imperial Gazetteer on dsal.uchicago.edu - Mahi Kantha

Princely states of Gujarat
Koli princely states